Robie Creek is a census-designated place in Boise County, Idaho, United States. Its population was 1,162 as of the 2010 census.

Robie Creek offers a recreation area with swimming, children's play area and a boat launch and dock Robie Creek Park. Vault toilets are available however cell phone service is not.

Demographics

2010 census 
As of the 2010 census, the population density was 38.6 inhabitants per square mile.

The racial makeup was 96.5% White, 0.4% African American, 0.5% Native American, 0.4% Asian, 0.3% from other races, and 1.9% from two or more races. Hispanic or Latino people of any race were 2.1% of the population.

The median age was 47.2 years old. 20% of residents were under the age of 18; 4% were between the ages of 18 and 24; 21% were between the ages of 25 and 44; 45% were between the ages of 45 and 64; and 10% were 65 years of age or older. The gender makeup was 54% men and 46% women.

Climate 
The climatic region has large seasonal temperature differences, with warm to hot, dry summers and cold (sometimes severely cold) winters. According to the Köppen Climate Classification system, Robie Creek has a humid continental climate, abbreviated "Dfb" on climate maps.

References

Census-designated places in Boise County, Idaho
Census-designated places in Idaho